The 2022 UCI Mountain Bike World Championships were held in the French commune Les Gets from 24 to 28 August 2022.

Les Gets, located in the Haute-Savoie department in the Auvergne-Rhône-Alpes region of France close to the border with Switzerland, previously hosted the 2004 UCI Mountain Bike & Trials World Championships. The Les Gets Bike Park, which is located within the Portes du Soleil ski area, has  of marked trails and provides for downhill, cross-country, freestyle, freeride, and e-mountain biking.

Competition format
The following competitions and rider categories were contested at this event of the UCI Mountain Bike World Championships:

In addition, a team relay was held restricted to one team of six riders per country. The default team composition was one man elite, one woman elite, one man U23, one man juniors, one woman U23 and one woman juniors, but the rules also allowed for substitutions.

Medal summary

Medal table

Men's events 
The elite downhill saw an all-French podium, with Loïc Bruni winning his fifth elite downhill world championship. In the short track, New Zealand's Sam Gaze and the incumbent American world champion, Christopher Blevins, were competing for the title when both aimed for the same line at the last rock garden. Blevins crashed and eventually crossed the line in 16th place while Gaze took the title.

Women's events

Team event
Eighteen teams competed in the team event, with seventeen of those finishing. The French team was in the lead when their fifth rider crashed and had to finish the lap standing after having lost the saddle, dropping to fifth place. Switzerland won the world title ahead of Italy and the United States. New Zealand had been in third position when their third rider crashed; the team did not finish.

Under-23 and Junior events

See also
 2022 UCI Mountain Bike World Cup

References

UCI Mountain Bike World Championships
World Championships
2022 in French sport
International sports competitions hosted by France
Cycling in France
UCI